Oliwia Kiołbasa (born 26 April 2000 in Augustów) is a Polish chess player.

She has won the girls' under-10 European Youth Chess Championship, and was runner-up in the girls' under-14 World Youth Chess Championship.

FIDE awarded Kiołbasa the Woman International Master title in 2016.

In August 2021, Kiołbasa finished third in the Women's European Individual Chess Championship. She earned her first norm for the International Master (IM) title. Kiołbasa earned a second IM norm in the Polski Ekstraliga in October.

Kiołbasa represented Poland in the 2022 Chess Olympiad, winning her first nine games. She finished the tournament with 9.5 points out of 11 rounds. She earned her third and final IM norm, which qualifies her for the IM title. She was the best individual player in the women's event. She defeated IM Vaishali R, which clinched a match win for Poland against India's first team. Her only loss was in the last round against Ukrainian GM Anna Ushenina.

References

External links 

Polish female chess players
Chess Woman International Masters
2000 births
Living people
People from Augustów